Ebus Chukwubuka Onuchukwu  (born 9 April 1984 in Lagos) is a Nigerian football player who currently plays for FC Baník Ostrava in the Czech first division, Czech 1. Liga, as a striker.

Career
He previously had spells at Ethnikos Katerini F.C. and Atsalenios F.C. in Greece.

References

1984 births
Living people
Nigerian footballers
Lowestoft Town F.C. players
FC Baník Ostrava players
Czech First League players
Nigerian expatriate footballers
Expatriate footballers in Greece
Expatriate footballers in the Czech Republic
Expatriate footballers in England
Association football forwards